Goodwine is an unincorporated community in southern Iroquois County, Illinois, United States.

Geography
Goodwine lies along Iroquis County Road 800 East approximately 14 miles south of the city of Watseka, the county seat.  Its elevation is 659 feet (201 m), and it is located at  (40.5672584, -87.7844742) near the northeast corner of Fountain Creek Township.  Although Goodwine is unincorporated, it has a post office, with the ZIP code of 60939.

The town sits at the intersection of two rail lines, an active Union Pacific route connecting Chicago and St. Louis, and a defunct east–west Chicago and Eastern Illinois Railroad line.

Fountain Creek runs west of town, flowing northeast toward its confluence with Mud Creek.

References

Unincorporated communities in Iroquois County, Illinois
Unincorporated communities in Illinois